Pamela Harrison (28 November 1915 – 28 August 1990) was an English composer, pianist and music teacher.

Biography
Pamela Harrison was born in Orpington, England, and educated at the Brampton Down School for Girls in Folkestone. She studied with Gordon Jacob and Arthur Benjamin at the Royal College of Music in London. She first made her mark as a composer with the Quintet for flute, oboe and strings, written in 1938 and first performed that year at a concert of the Society for the Promotion of New Music. The Quintet was heard again in 1944 at Fyvie Hall, Regent Street, played by an ensemble led by Leonard Hirsch.

During World War II, she worked as a school teacher. She was music mistress at The Hall School, Wincanton, Somerset in 1942, and at St Monica's School, Clacton-on-Sea from 1943 until 1945. She also continued to compose and perform. Her String Quartet was played more than once at the wartime Myra Hess National Gallery concerts in 1944.

After the war Harrison went on to compose chamber and orchestral music, as well as vocal settings of Baudelaire, Herrick, Dowson and Edward Thomas. The Viola Sonata was written in 1946 and performed a year later at the Wigmore Hall. Watson Forbes and Alan Richardson gave its first broadcast performance on 17 March 1951. Her piece for small orchestra, A Suite for Timothy, was composed for the first birthday of her son in 1948 and first performed at Hampton Court in 1949.

She married the cellist and conductor Harvey Phillips (1910 – active until late 1970s) in 1943. They lived initially at The Red House, Crockham Hill, Kent, and then at "The Cearne", (previously the house of Edward and Constance Garnett). Harvey was a member of the Hirsch String Quartet and made his professional conducting debut with the Jacques Orchestra at the Wigmore Hall in 1950 (at which he conducted his wife's Suite for Tomothy). That year he formed the Harvey Phillips String Orchestra (with leader Hugh Bean), which included in its repertoire Harrison's Five Poems of Ernest Dowson for tenor and string orchestra - the first London performance with Peter Pears as the soloist on 15 December 1952 at the Royal Festival Hall - and her Six Poems of Baudelaire.  Pamela Harrison wrote her 1944 Cello Sonata for Harvey, who gave its debut performance with pianist John Wills at the Wigmore Hall on 9 May 1947. The marriage ended in 1959.

The Clarinet Sonata was written for Jack Brymer, who was also the soloist in several performances and broadcasts of the Clarinet Quintet in the late 1950s. In May 1959, Harrison's Concertante for piano and string orchestra with Eric Harrison (not related) as soloist was broadcast on BBC Radio. An archive recording exists.

Harrison's work was influenced by composers including E.J. Moeran, Arnold Bax and John Ireland, and French music. She also studied Dalcroze eurhythmics, giving exhibitions with Emile Jaques-Dalcroze in Brighton. She died aged 74 in a car accident in Firle, East Sussex. Jack Brymer performed the short piece Drifting Away at her Service of Thanksgiving in December 1990.

Selected works
Orchestral
 A Suite for Timothy for string orchestra (1948)
 Concertante for piano and string orchestra (1954)
 An Evocation of the Weald, symphonic poem (1954)
 Brimstone Down for small orchestra (1958)

Chamber music
 Allegretto for cello and piano (c.1935); published in The Strad, February 2003
 Quintet for flute, oboe, violin, viola and cello (1938)
 String Quartet (1944)
 String Trio (1945)
 Sonata for viola and piano (1946)
 Woodwind Quintet (1948)
 Sonata for cello and piano (1947)
 Sonatina for violin and piano (fp. Wigmore Hall, 15 October 1949)
 Sonata for clarinet and piano (1954)
 Clarinet Quintet for clarinet, 2 violins, viola and cello (1956)
 Idle Dan, or, Nothing to Do for cello and piano (1959)
 2 Pieces for cello and piano (1959)
   White May Morning
   A Marsh Song
 Badinage for flute and piano (1963)
 Chase a Shadow for oboe and piano (1963)
 Faggot Dance for bassoon and piano (1963)
 Sonnet in D minor for cello and piano (1963)
 Lament for viola and piano (1965)
 Piano Trio for violin, cello and piano (1967)
 Quartet for flute, violin, cello and piano (1968)
 Quintet for flute, oboe, violin, cello and piano (1974)
 Drifting Away for clarinet and piano (1975)
 5 Pieces for flute and piano (1976)
 Septet for clarinet, horn, bassoon, violin, viola, cello and double bass (1980)
 Octetto Pastorale for wind octet (2 oboes, 2 clarinets, 2 horns, 2 bassoons) (1981)
 Mariner's Way for flute and piano (1982)
 Lullaby for cello and piano
 Rock Grove Suite for flute, cello and piano (1989)
 Trio for oboe, bassoon and piano

Organ
 Epithalamium (1967)

Piano
 Anderida, 6 Diversions (1960)
   Romney Marsh Goblin
   A Canterbury Tale
   Hoppers' Dance
   Childdingstone Cherry Pickers
   Ebb tide at Sandgate
   Faversham Fair
 6 Eclogues of Portugal (1960)
 6 Dances for Fanny Simon for piano 4-hands (1976)

Vocal
 The Lonely Landscape for voice and piano (1944); words by Emily Brontë
   Fall, leaves, fall; die, flowers, away
   I'm happiest now when most away
   The night is darkening round me
   The battle has passed from the height
   The starry night shall tidings bring
   'Tis moonlight, summer moonlight
 6 Poems of Baudelaire for tenor and string orchestra (1944–1945); words by Charles Baudelaire
 8 Poems of Walter de la Mare for voice and piano (1949); words by Walter de la Mare
   Blindman's In
   A Goldfinch
   White
   Dreamland
   Where
   Why?
   The Horseman
   Nicoletta
 5 Poems of Ernest Dowson for tenor and string orchestra (1951–1952); words by Ernest Dowson
   
   
   
   Villanelle of Marguerite's
   
 The Kindling of the Day for voice and string quartet (1952)
 2 Songs for voice and piano (1954); words by Walter de la Mare
 The Dark Forest, Song Cycle for tenor and string orchestra (1957); words by Edward Thomas
 8 Songs for voice, recorder and piano (1959); words by Walter de la Mare
 Ladies' Choice for voice, violin, cello and harp (1969); words by Walter de la Mare

Choral
 Songs for children's chorus and piano (1969); words by Walter de la Mare

Recordings
Selected recordings include: 
 A Portrait of the Viola – Sonata for viola and piano: Helen Callus (viola), Robert McDonald (piano). ASV CD DCA 1130 (2002)
 English String Miniatures, Volume 5 – A Suite for Timothy: Gavin Sutherland (conductor), Royal Ballet Sinfonia. Naxos 8.557752 (2006)
 La Viola: Music for Viola and Piano by Women Composers of the 20th Century – Lament, Viola Sonata: Hillary Herndon (viola), Wei-Chun Bernadette Lo (piano).  MSR 1416 (2012)
 Eclogues of Portugal: performed by pianist Marc Verter. Sidholme Music Room, 21 June 2018
 Chamber Works – Piano Trio, Violin Sonatina, Clarinet Quintet, Clarinet Sonata, Idle Dan (cello and piano), Sonnet (violin and piano), Drifting Away (clarinet and piano). Gould Piano Trio, Robert Plane, David Adams, Gary Pomeroy. Resonus RES10313 (2023)

Sources

References

External links
Official website
 Extract, Clarinet Quintet, Jack Brymer, Arnici String Quartet, BBC broadcast, 1959

1915 births
1990 deaths
20th-century classical composers
English classical pianists
English women pianists
English classical composers
British women classical composers
British music educators
20th-century classical pianists
20th-century English composers
Road incident deaths in England
People from Orpington
Alumni of the Royal College of Music
20th-century English women musicians
Women music educators
20th-century women composers
20th-century women pianists